The 2017 BBL-Pokal Final decided the winner of the 2017 BBL-Pokal. The match was played at the Mercedes-Benz Arena in Berlin on 19 February 2017.

The final featured Bayern Munich, the runners-up of the previous season, and Brose Bamberg, the defending BBL champions. Brose Bamberg won the match 71–74 to claim their fifth cup title.

Route to the final
Note: In all results below, the score of the finalist is given first (H: home; A: away).

Match

References

BBL-Pokal seasons
BBL-Pokal